is a 1998 Japanese manga series by Rei Mikamoto, chronicling the exploits of Reiko Himezono, a teenage "zombie shop", or a "...necromancer-for-hire employed by bereaved families to resurrect departed loved ones for a short time so that the dead may impart their final truths to the living." Eleven tankoubon have been released by Bunkasha Comics. Six volumes have been released in English by Dark Horse Comics, translated by Michael Gombos. However, according to Dark Horse, the series' English publication has been discontinued.

Summary

Volume One
Reiko is introduced as a schoolgirl and a "zombie shop"; a professional necromancer who, for a substantial fee, reanimates the dead, for the purpose of obtaining information from them. This offers her an opportunity to work as a detective and solve murder cases by temporarily reviving the victim and asking them who killed them. In the introductory acts of the book, for instance, she resurrects a girl who committed suicide, who, unbeknownst to her mother, was being molested by her father. The zombified girl kills the father, and, in a black-humour twist common to the series, the mother pays Reiko double her prior fee to reanimate the father so she can torture him.

This volume mostly follows an unconnected episodic format, with each successive act or chapter being a recounting of a separate case. These include a jealous killing among her circle of friends, an obsessive biology teacher attempting to bring back a beloved student, a tussle with bank robbers, and a stint as an unusual bodyguard for a dying goth-rock star. However, acts not featuring Reiko begin to appear, which cut away to the exploits of teenage serial killer Saki Yurikawa. Driven by a fanatical desire to have a younger sister to care for, Yurikawa kidnaps young girls and tries to force them into a sisterly role, but they inevitably end up fearing and hating her, causing her to become enraged and murder them. In the final chapters, Reiko and Yurikawa's paths converge when Reiko is called in to a hospital by the police to revive one of Yurikawa's victims. The young zombie goes berserk and tracks down Yurikawa, who happens to be in the hospital at the time with another girl. Reiko and Yurikawa fight; Reiko is killed, but, having anticipated this, manages to zombify herself with a tape-recorded incantation. She defeats Yurikawa, but not before being reduced herself to only a severed head, apparently lifeless.  Yurikawa eventually becomes her "contract" zombie as the series furthers.

Volume Two
After a chance confrontation between two opposing factions of necromancers, Reiko manages to attach her head to a freshly killed body, returning her to non-zombie status. She joins forces with a group of young zombie summoners, Yuki and Rudoh, who oppose the more malevolent majority consisting of a cult of necromancers led by Reiko's elder sister Riruka, who seek "global zombification".

In this volume, a Shin Megami Tensei-like element is introduced, whereby summoners each have a "faithful zombie" they can call forth to fight on their side. Reiko's faithful is a zombified (and significantly more scantily-clad) Yurikawa, now mindlessly and speechlessly bound to Reiko's will.

Along with the adversary Riruka, a new major ally is introduced in this volume - a mercenary named Jasmine, a somewhat vapid and heartless but talented fighter, who interrupts a climactic fight scene to offer her skills to the highest bidder. Reiko rejects her steep asking price, but saves her life, thereby indebting her to her cause.

The volume ends with Reiko and Jasmine fighting their way through Riruka's mansion, one of Riruka's assistants having tricked Reiko's summoner friends into killing one another.

Characters
Reiko Himezono: Reiko is the main character of the manga. She is a "Zombie Shop," a necromancer-for-hire who brings the dead back to life, for a price. Reiko manages to keep her business ethics and her personal feelings separate, following out her contracts with her clients word by word. If by any chance her client has violated his end of the bargain, such as skimping on the bill, is engaging in criminal activity (such as an incident where Reiko encountered two kidnappers who assaulted her once their plan was discovered) or keeping any details about her job secret, she voids the contract and leaves them to the mess they have made. Reiko is very down-to-earth and miserly, being almost always driven by money. She even goes as far as to charge her friend for a job. In the first volume, when she becomes hired by a famous rock star named Shilaw to re-animate him on stage if anything should happen, he offers to pay her over 3,000,000 yen, and she hopes throughout the story that he does die so she can collect the money. She is reduced to a severed head by the end of the first volume due to Saki Yurikawa, but her head is then attached to the body of a recently killed teenage girl.
Riruka Himezono: Riruka is Reiko's psychotic and megalomaniacal twin sister, introduced in the second volume. While Riruka appears to have an unlimited number of zombies at her disposal, Holy Mithras is the only one that is given a name. Riruka dreams of ruling the world with a zombie army at her command, but the one thorn in her side has been her sister. Her backstory was given in the third volume. Since she was a child, Riruka had taken great pleasure in causing fear in her sister, and used her summoning powers on small animals which she butchered and sewed together. Her parents, who had given both girls equal love and attention, considered sending Riruka away and chose Reiko to be the Zombie Shop's successor, so Riruka orchestrated their death in an airplane crash using a zombified rat hidden in their luggage. Reiko and Riruka were then sent to separate orphanages and did not see one another for years. During Riruka's time in an orphanage, her abilities caught the eye of a group of summoners, whom quickly fell under her control as she began dreaming of world conquest. It is also revealed that she was shot in the head by a shell of fate and was made into a zombie slave at some point. However, because she was looking in the mirror prior to being shot, Riruka retained her free will and brutally mutilated her servant Shiroko as punishment for her betrayal before becoming obsessed with the superhuman powers the Shell of Fate had given her and going on a murderous rampage to hunt down the Star Collector. At this point, she becomes more of an antihero rather than a villain. She is killed at the beginning of Volume 7 during a battle with a zombie created from one of the shells of fate when said zombie impaled her with a katana, but Riruka manages to redeem herself by killing the zombie and her soul is taken into Hell by a limbless psychopomp after Riruka makes peace with Reiko. Riruka later returns as the zombie servant of Chigusa, only appearing when her summoner is endangered.

The Shell of Fate granted Riruka immense superhuman strength, impressive regeneration abilities, and the ability to resist pain, even when her body was destroyed by gunfire. While possessing the shell of fate, Riruka was also capable of producing a series of lethal tentacles that she could use to impale her enemies on. A notable trait about Riruka is that despite her knowledge of summoning and her incredible power, she is shown to be illiterate and completely uneducated without her summoning powers, much to the annoyance of her assistant Shiroko.

Shiroko Zeromoto: Dr. Zero's manipulative, cowardly daughter. Shiroko is a slightly masculine woman who acts as the assistant of Riruka. After obtaining the shells of fate, she attempted to use them to make Riruka a zombie slave. However, since Riruka was looking in a hand mirror prior to being shot, Riruka retained her free will and using her newly acquired superhuman strength, brutally tore Shiroko's leg off. Just as Shiroko was about to be finished off by her master, Shiroko was gunned down by a member of a militant group while Riruka survived the shooting.
Jasmine Mendosa: A friend of Reiko, and the self-proclaimed "Beautiful Mercenary." Her faithful zombie is Victory Katana. She is introduced in the second volume when she helps Reiko, Yuki, Rudoh, and Mayo against Suipin and her four compatriots during the bus ride to Riruka's mansion. Jasmine is the only survivor of the events that occurred in Riruka's mansion besides Reiko, and has since joined her on other adventures later on in the series. Jasmine is the first black character introduced in the series. As the story progresses during Volume seven and onwards, Jasmine becomes more muscular in physique.
Yuki Tohdoh: A friend of Reiko's, and the elder brother of Mayo Tohdoh. His faithful zombie is Jack Guns. Yuki was originally a friend of Ryoka Amano (along with Rudoh Mishima) before Reiko grafted her head onto Ryoka's body. When he was younger, he took his sister Mayo's doll and ran across a busy street with it. When Mayo attempted to give chase, her legs were torn apart by an oncoming car, and she was permanently crippled. This experience has haunted Yuki for his entire life, and was revealed during the second volume when Sinner's Nightmare (the faithful zombie of Riruka's servant Tracy), spat its non-lethal venom onto the protagonists. Ultimately, Yuki was tempted with the promise of having Mayo's legs fixed by Dr. Zero under the condition that he kill Rudoh. After killing Rudoh (much to Mayo's dismay), Yuki discovers Dr. Zero's deception and attacks him. However, Yuki eviscerated with a claymore by Dr. Zero, one of Riruka's most trusted servants. However, in his dying moments, Yuki orders Jack Guns to impale Dr. Zero with a large cross Jack had been tied to.
Tracey: A  frail young woman who serves as a guard of Riruka's mansion. She is shot dead by Jack Guns after she used her zombie Sinner's Nightmare to cause Yuki to remember his sister being hit by a car.
Risa Nekogami: A young necromancer who worked alongside Ideto Tanii to kill Reiko and her friends. Despite possessing the cruelty of a child, she is extremely cowardly. After Chameleon Model Six was destroyed by Jack and Robin, Nekogami becomes desperate and attempts to make peace with Reiko by offering her information after Riruka disowned her for not being able to summon any other zombies. However, Saki beheads Nekogami while Reiko zombifies her severed head to get information on Riruka's current location.
Roses Killmister: A particularly cruel necromancer fully devoted to Riruka. She does not allow anybody but her master to touch her, and she retaliates with extreme violence towards anybody who does not act in accordance to her expectations. She ultimately commits suicide upon losing her zombie, Black Widow.
Mayo Todoh: A friend of Reiko's, and the younger sister of Yuki Todoh. Her faithful zombie (revealed to exist at the end of the Riruka's mansion arc) is Eddie, King of Aces. Mayo is paraplegic, as a result of her legs being torn apart by an oncoming car after attempting to cross the street to get her doll back from her brother Yuki, who had taken it as a prank. Ultimately, Mayo was disemboweled by Riruka.
Rudoh Mishima: A friend of Reiko's. His faithful zombie is General Robin Davis. He was originally the friend of both Ryoka Amano and Yuki Todoh. Yuki dislikes his "friends die, so keep going" attitude. Ultimately, he is shot dead by Jack Guns after Yuki betrayed Rudoh.
Dr. Zero: A scientist responsible for the creation of several zombies. He is known for his violent temper, often assaulting his servants for trivial reasons. Later, he tempts Yuki with the promise of restoring Mayo's legs to working condition if he killed Rudoh. However, Dr. Zero had been deceiving Yuki and later attempted to kill Yuki with a claymore Robin left behind after being torn to pieces by Dr. Zero's zombie, Medical Death. Dr. Zero is finally killed by Jack Guns in retaliation for Yuki being betrayed by him. Dr. Zero is later revealed to be the father of Shiroko and his real last name is Zeromoto.
Ryoka Amano: A summoner and friend of Yuki and Rudoh. Her faithful zombie is Rickhart Heidrich. Her origins are never explained, as she is abruptly introduced at the beginning of volume two and soon thereafter is beheaded. However, later on, Ryoka's head is zombified by Reiko, and she appears to help battle in Riruka's mansion with Rickhart.
Star Collector: A flamboyant, foul-mouthed summoner with the ability to steal the summoning powers of other summoners. He does this for no other reason other than for pleasure, yet admits he is afraid of people taking revenge on him. Despite his muscular, intimidating appearance and having a mass number of zombies under his command, The Star Collector is in reality a weak coward who goes into a state of fear and panic in a second, preferring to run away from confrontations rather than try to kill his opponents. He manages to steal the powers of Reiko and Riruka, but was forced to return the summoning powers of Reiko in order to forge an alliance with her. However, this alliance is soon short lived after he was shot in the head by an assailant from a militant group who had been pursuing Reiko and Riruka, much to Reiko's horror. It is unclear whether or not the summoning powers he had stolen returned to their respective owners after he was killed.
Ideto Tanii: A sadomasochistic necromancer with a goth like appearance reminiscent of Cradle of Filth vocalist Daniel Filth. He is commonly seen wearing various finger armour on his hands, which he uses to harm himself or others. Tanii also has a habit of placing his hands over his face when he becomes annoyed with his colleagues. He is capable of controlling people via he zombie servant Mudo Kalambra, often sending out those he curses to commit murder and leaving the victim to blame for the crime. Tanii attempts to possess Azusa as a hostage and has her commit various murders. He later reveals that any pain inflicted on him or Mudo will be inflicted on the possessed. However, he is killed by Saki Yurikawa, taking Azusa with him as a result of the possession.

Zombies
Saki Yurikawa: Introduced in the first volume's side-stories, titled Dead Sister, Saki is a teenaged serial killer, a homicidal maniac who forces young girls to be her "little sister", and then brutally murders them when they refuse. When she was younger her original little sister, Midori ended up comatose after a younger Saki knocked her down a flight of stairs while trying to imitate the character of a magical girl anime series Saki use to watch. Since then, she's murdered over thirty young girls, and others who have gotten in her way. Saki meets her demise when she crosses paths with Reiko who, even reduced to a severed head, manages to kill Saki by summoning the souls of the people she's killed, leaving Saki to be forever tormented in Hell. From that point in the series, Saki serves the role as Reiko's faithful zombie, silently following Reiko's orders. It is unknown whether or not Saki's mute personality was a side-effect of the zombification or a result of post-traumatic stress disorder while she was imprisoned in Hell. Despite her murderous intentions, Saki has a fondness of sweets to the point where she once skipped school to get a sundae.

Midori Yurikawa: Midori is Saki's sixteen-year-old sister. She is shown as a generally weak, timid, but friendly young girl who goes into a berserker like state when angered. Ten years prior to the main storyline, Saki would frequently torment her as a child and would force her into playing different games with her (most of which ended in Midori getting beaten or injured). After being kicked down the stairs by Saki, she ended up in a coma and awoke ten years later with the mind of a six-year-old in a sixteen-year-old body. It was then that Midori was rehabilitated by Dr. Akiyama, who shared a mother-daughter type relationship with her (some scenes show Akiyama protecting Midori from the press, praising Midori for completing her kanji drills, and at one point reprimanding her for blaming a broken window on someone). After meeting Akiyama's daughter Natsumi, the two of them started to become friends. However, this friendship ended when a vengeful waitress mistook Midori for Saki and exposed Midori's relation to Saki, which caused Natsumi to hate her and eventually assaulting Midori. This incident (and the memories of the abuse Midori endured)caused Midori to finally snap and kill Natsumi. Her death attracted the unwanted attention of her Yakuza father, whom Midori quickly killed along with all his men. Midori was soon discovered by Reiko and was informed that Akiyama had committed suicide and needed a carrier of bombay blood type which Midori happened to be a carrier of. Midori donated her blood to save Akiyama's life, only to be murdered by the doctor, much to Reiko's chagrin. Midori later returns as the zombie servant of Reiko Himezono and proves to be a stronger zombie compared to Saki, preferring to use her fists in combat instead of a melee weapon.
Victory Katana: The faithful zombie of Jasmine. It is unknown what the zombie did during its life, but it is possible it may have been an illegal arms dealer. In death it serves Jasmine by providing her with a large array of melee weapons that Jasmine can use to defend herself. Victory Katana appears as a short masculine figure wearing what appears to be a poncho and a gas mask, with a huge backpack full of weapons on its back.
Mudo Kalambra: The zombie servant of Ideto Tanii. In life, Mudo was a former witch doctor of a South American tribe who would curse his victims and have them commit various crimes, then leave the cursed victim to blame for the crimes. Also, any pain that is inflicted on Mudo or his summoner will be inflicted onto the cursed. Mudo is shown dressed in tribal wear with his eyes sewn together, reflecting Tanii's masochistic behavior.
Jack Guns: The faithful zombie of Yuki. In life, Jack was an outlaw in the old west who was ambushed and killed by the local sheriff during a train robbery. He carries a large wooden crucifix on his back and fights with two pistols. Jack Guns is one of the only zombies capable of actually speaking.
Artificial Being No. 8: A zombie servant of Dr. Zero. Unlike other zombies, she is shown to have been artificially created (much like the bio weapons in Resident Evil or House of the Dead). She is shown to be capable of tearing her body apart to reveal numerous sharp teeth and tentacles. One notable running gag is that she is frequently assaulted by other necromancers, much to No. 8's chagrin.
Black Widow: A zombie servant of Killmister. She's an artificially created zombie made out of at least three pairs of arms, three heads and the remnants of several female victims. Black Widow's body is completely hollow; this allows her to be extremely fast. In spite of being highly skilled at surprise attacks and assassinations, she's mediocre at best at hand-to-hand combat; any attack will most likely decimate her body as she has no internal organs. Black Widow was ultimately defeated by a well-connected kick, which exposed her spine.
Chameleon Model Six: The zombie servant of Nekogami. It is unknown what he did in a past life, but it is implied he may be a creation of Dr. Zero as Artificial being No. 8 was shown to possess similar characteristics to his body. Chameleon appears as an androgynous young man who was at first mistaken for a summoner. However, he is revealed to be a shapeshifting zombie with a large right arm composed of the flesh of various animal corpses. He is killed by Jack and Robin when he attempted to assault Reiko. So far Chameleon is one of the only zombies capable of speaking normally.
Eddie, King of Aces: The faithful zombie of Mayo. In life, Eddie was a World War II pilot who fought in the Battle of Great Britain, his heart coincidentally stopping as his plain was overpowered by several German pilots. In death, Eddie appears only once, piloting his plane the Supermarine Spitfire. He wears only military fatigues.
General Robin Davis: The faithful zombie of Rudoh. In life, Robin was a knight who fought and died during the Wars of the Roses in 1455. In death, he defends Rudoh with a large claymore. He wears a suit of shining armor.
Rickhart Heidrich: The faithful zombie of Ryoka. In life, Rickhart was a soldier in the armored division of Nazi Germany who was killed in 1941 by friendly fire during the Invasion of the Soviet Union. In death, he protects Ryoka with a random hail of gunfire from a machine gun. Rickhart has a large gash in his face, which impairs his speech and wears military fatigues.

Reception
In a list of "10 Great Zombie Manga", Anime News Network's Jason Thompson placed Reiko the Zombie Shop in tenth place, calling it a "maggot-covered undead mayhem from start to finish".

Reiko’s manga later rank top list.

References

External links

Thompson, Jason. "Jason Thompson's House of 1000 Manga Reiko the Zombie Shop." Anime News Network. May 5, 2011.

1998 manga
Dark Horse Comics titles
Fictional necromancers
Horror anime and manga
Josei manga
Zombies in anime and manga
Zombies in comics